Louise Jacqueline Sorel (née Cohen, born August 6, 1940) is an American actress. She is perhaps best known for her role as Vivian Alamain in Days of Our Lives from 1992 to 2000, 2009 to 2011, 2017 to 2018, and 2020, Augusta Wainwright on Santa Barbara from 1984 to 1991,  and Emily Tanner on Beacon Hill since 2014.

Early life 
Sorel was born in Los Angeles, California, the daughter of a Hollywood producer father and an Egyptian mother who is a professional concert pianist.

Sorel received theatrical training at the Neighborhood Playhouse School of the Theatre in New York. She briefly attended the Institut Français, where she studied French. Sorel is Jewish. She began performing on stage when she was 15 years old.

Career 
Sorel's early career was on the stage; she spent several years on Broadway, playing roles in Take Her, She's Mine and Man and Boy. She appeared in stage productions of The Lion in Winter and The Sign in Sidney Brustein's Window.

Sorel's first feature film appearance was in the film The Party's Over (1965). She appeared in Plaza Suite (1971),  Night Gallery episode "Pickman's Model" (1971), B.S. I Love You (1971), Every Little Crook and Nanny (1972), The Return of Charlie Chan (1973), Airplane II: The Sequel (1982), Mazes and Monsters (1982), Where the Boys Are '84 (1984), and Crimes of Passion (1984) among others. She has made guest appearances on more than 50 prime time programs and TV movies, making a guest appearance on Star Trek (as "Rayna", in the episode "Requiem for Methuselah", which aired in 1969). She also portrayed Terry Waverly, the sister-in-law of Dr. Richard Kimble in an episode of The Fugitive in 1965.

She made other guest appearances on such programs as Bonanza (as Marie in the episode "The Strange One", 1965), Daniel Boone, The Virginian, Route 66, The Big Valley, The Fugitive,  Search (as Magda Reiner, in "Live Men Tell Tales"), Vega$, Hart to Hart, Medical Center, Charlie's Angels, The Incredible Hulk, Hawaii Five-O, The Eddie Capra Mysteries, Knots Landing, and Sabrina the Teenage Witch, among others. She had a principal role on The Don Rickles Show. Sorel played Helena Varga, a young woman from a disadvantaged background whose photographic memory becomes valuable to a drug kingpin in the David L. Wolper television production Get Christie Love (1974), starring Teresa Graves. Sorel played Eleanor Greeley in the Magnum, P.I. episode "One More Summer" (1982).

Her first daytime dramatic role was as eccentric, meddlesome Augusta Wainwright on the NBC daytime drama Santa Barbara. She appeared on Santa Barbara from July 1984 to August 1986, then from November 1988 to May 1989, returning the following October. She remained until October 1991.

In between stints, she also spent a year appearing as strong-willed but decent District Attorney Judith Russell Sanders on the ABC soap opera One Life to Live, from August 1986 through November 1987. She played the villainous Vivian Alamain on the NBC daytime serial, Days of Our Lives from March 1992 until February 2000. Sorel's performance as Alamain garnered her five Soap Opera Digest Awards as "Outstanding Villainess" in 1994, "Outstanding Showstopper" in 1997 and again in 1999 as "Outstanding Scene Stealer".

In 2000, shortly after her dismissal from Days of Our Lives, Sorel briefly joined the cast of the Port Charles as fashion maven "Donatella Stewart" (a play on the names Donatella Versace and Martha Stewart). The role lasted for a month. In 2001, she had a brief role on another ABC soap opera All My Children as "Judge Kay Campobello" who blackmailed Adam Chandler into sleeping with her. She made a brief appearance on Passions as cannery worker Dort in 2004. In December 2009, she was invited to reprise her villainous role on Days of Our Lives.

In June 2011, Sorel was let go from Days of Our Lives along with many other actors to make room for the return of supercouple John and Marlena and several other characters. In 2014, Sorel played Emily Tanner in the soap opera web series Beacon Hill.

On December 29, 2017, Sorel returned to Days of Our Lives as Vivian. However, she was briefly replaced by Robin Strasser. On December 30, 2019, it was announced that Sorel would once again return to the role in 2020.

Filmography 
 2014, 2020: Beacon Hill – Emily Tanner
 1992–2000, 2009–11, 2017–18, 2020, 2023: Days of Our Lives – Vivian Alamain
 2004: Passions – Dort
 1998: Sabrina the Teenage Witch – Mrs Saberhagen
 1996: Law & Order – "Causa Mortis" as Marcy Fletcher Wrightman
 1984–1991: Santa Barbara – Augusta Lockridge
 1986–87: One Life to Live – Judith Sanders 
 1984: Matt Houston — “Eyewitness” as Barbara Daniels 
 1983: Diff'rent Strokes – Robin Saunders
 1982: Mazes and Monsters – Julia
 1982: Airplane II: The Sequel – Nurse
 1982: Hart to Hart – "Blue and Broken Harted" season 3 episode 16 – Pat Yankee
 1982: Knots Landing – Bess Riker
 1982: Trapper John, M.D. – Marty Katz
 1982: Magnum, P.I. – Eleanor Greeley
 1977: Kojak – Janice Maclay
 1973: Circle of Fear - Nisa King
 1973: The President's Plane Is Missing - Joanna Spencer
 1972: The Don Rickles Show – Barbara Robinson
 1972: Banacek – Alicia Danato
 1971: B.S. I Love You - Ruth
 1971: Night Gallery - Victorian woman
 1969: Star Trek: The Original Series – "Requiem for Methuselah" as Rayna
 1968: Mannix – "Delayed Action" as Danielle Michaels / Merry Higgins
 1967: The Rat Patrol - "The Fatal Reunion Raid" as Gabrielle
 1967: The Flying Nun - S1E4 "A Bell for San Tanco" as Binkie
 1965: Bonanza – Marie
 1965: The Virginian - "The Dream Of Stavros Karas" - Eleni Niarcos 
 1965:  The Fugitive - "The Survivors" as Terry Waverly

 1963: The Defenders - "Conspiracy of Silence" as Margie Spencer

Awards

References

External links

 
 Louise Sorel interview, The Spectrum, Accessed May 16, 2017.

Living people
American film actresses
American soap opera actresses
American stage actresses
American television actresses
Actresses from Los Angeles
Jewish American actresses
20th-century American actresses
21st-century American actresses
21st-century American Jews
1940 births